Woodstock station or Woodstock railway station may refer to:
 Woodstock, Ontario railway station, a Via Rail station in Woodstock, Ontario, Canada
 Woodstock railway station (Cape Town), a Metrorail station in Cape Town, South Africa
 Woodstock station (Illinois), a Metra station in Woodstock, Illinois
 Blenheim and Woodstock railway station, a disused railway station in Woodstock, England
 Woodstock railway station, New South Wales, a heritage-listed former railway station in Woodstock, New South Wales, Australia